Doris Simeon (born 22 July 1979) is a Nigerian Yoruba and English actress, compere, hairdresser and entrepreneur. She is the CEO of Davris Beauty centre situated at Ifako Lagos.

Acting career
Doris first love was to be a newscaster, but when a friend told her about an audition for a cameo role in a situational comedy sitcom by Wale Adenuga Production (WAP) called "Papa Ajasco" she went for the audition and she was given the role. A Yoruba and English actress, Simeon started with a part in three episodes of the Papa Ajasco comedy series. She then had parts in Nollywood films Oloju Ede, Alakada, Ten Million Naira and Modupe Temi. She has also appeared in Eti Keta

In 2010, she starred as Da Grin's girlfriend in Ghetto Dreamz. and co-produced with Omo Iya kan.

Given her first role by late movie director cum actor Yomi Ogunmola, Simeon rose to the top starring in over 100 films including Eti Keta, Oloju Ede, Alakada, Ten Million Naira, Abani Kedun, Iseju Marun, Omo Iya Kan, Ghetto Dreams, Silence, Gucci Girls, Alakada, Omo Pupa, Asiri and Modupe Temi.

A born actress with ability to double as master of ceremony and TV show host, Doris began her career with a part in three episodes of the Papa Ajasco comedy series.

Endorsement

In July 2015, Doris renewed her contract with GlaxoSmithKline to be the face of Ribena, a popular children fruit drink.

Awards
2008 AMAA awards Best Indigenous Actress  Onitemi.
2010 Zafaa Award Best Actress Indigenous Asiri
 2015 All Youths Tush Awards AYTA Role Model (Movie) Award

Personal life
She was married to producer and director Daniel Ademinokan, whom she met on set. They have one son David. , they divorced.

References

External links
 
https://www.codedjam.com/2014/02/doris-simeon-spotted-on-sets-of-lincoln.html
http://naijagists.com/doris-simeon-paid-n2million-for-new-movie-role-nigerian-actress-on-movie-set-in-south-africa/
https://codedwapng.com/2016/07/doris-simeon-shares-new-stunning-photos-as-she-adds-a-new-year/
http://www.pmnewsnigeria.com/2014/02/28/doris-simeon-bags-international-role/0
https://web.archive.org/web/20140303082744/http://www.punchng.com/entertainment/saturday-beats/doris-simeons-son-is-not-a-kid-actor-manager/
https://movies.codedwap.com/download/doris-simeon-biography-and-net-worth/LS05NUFlblh1ODU0WQ

Living people
Actresses from Lagos
Yoruba actresses
21st-century Nigerian actresses
Nigerian film actresses
Nigerian television actresses
Actresses in Yoruba cinema
1977 births
Nigerian film award winners
Nigerian chief executives
Nigerian women in business
Nigerian film producers
Nigerian women film producers